Stade du 28 Septembre is a multi-purpose stadium in Conakry, Guinea. It is currently used mostly for football matches. The stadium has a capacity of 25,000 people.

In an attempt to host the 2023 African Cup of Nations (ANC), or Coupe d'Afrique des Nations (CAN) in French, proposals have been made to upgrade or reconstruct the 28 September Stadium to an all seater capacity of 45,000–50,000 people.

Events
some of the Football matches of the national team
Football matches of major teams of Guinea
Funeral of Ahmed Sékou Touré and
Funeral of general Lansana Conté
political meetings

Name
The Stadium gets its name from 28 September. The day Guinea famously voted NO in the French referendum, which ultimately led to the political independence of Guinea on 2 October 1958. Guinea-Conakry (formerly French Guinea) is the first former French colony in Sub-Saharan Africa to attain political independence.

28 September protest

On 28 September 2009 opposition party members demonstrated in the Stade du 28 Septembre, demanding that Guinean president Captain Moussa Dadis Camara step down. Security forces fired into the crowd killing 157 people and injuring 1,200. In response to criticism from international human rights organisations, the government has said that only 56 people died and most were trampled by fleeing protesters. The International Criminal Court is currently investigating the incident and the African Union asked for Camara's resignation.

References

Football venues in Guinea
Guinea
Sport in Conakry
Buildings and structures in Conakry
Multi-purpose stadiums
Horoya AC